Train to Zakopané is a 2017 American drama film written and directed by Henry Jaglom and starring Mike Falkow and Tanna Frederick.  It is based on Jaglom's 2014 play of the same name.

Cast
Mike Falkow as Semyon
Tanna Frederick as Katya
Stephen Howard as Father Alexandrov
Cathy Arden as Madame Nadia Selmeczy

Release
The film premiered at the Los Angeles Jewish Film Festival on April 29, 2017.

Reception
Michael Rechtshaffen of the Los Angeles Times gave the film a negative review and wrote, "In the absence of any subtlety, Jaglom’s protracted discourse on intolerance and compassion begins losing dramatic steam long before it reaches its intended destination."

References

External links
 
 

2010s English-language films
Films directed by Henry Jaglom